The T. A. Moulton Barn is a historic barn within the Mormon Row Historic District in Teton County, Wyoming, United States.

Description
 

The barn is all that remains of the homestead built by Thomas Alma Moulton and his sons between about 1912 and 1945. It sits west of the road known as Mormon Row, in an area called Antelope Flats, between the towns of Kelly and Moose. Now lying within Grand Teton National Park, it is near the homestead of Andy Chambers. The property with the barn was one of the last parcels sold to the National Park Service by the Moulton family. Often photographed, the barn with the Teton Range in the background has become a symbol of Jackson Hole, Wyoming.

See also

 National Register of Historic Places listings in Grand Teton National Park
 National Register of Historic Places listings in Teton County, Wyoming
 Historical buildings and structures of Grand Teton National Park

References

External links

 Mormon Row at Grand Teton National Park
 
 T.A. Moulton Land Patent at BLM General Land Office Records
 Mormon Row Historical District—history, photos, and maps of the original community

Historic American Buildings Survey in Wyoming
Buildings and structures in Grand Teton National Park
Historic district contributing properties in Wyoming
Mormon Row Historic District